Ian Grant Jack (7 February 1945 – 28 October 2022) was a British reporter, writer and editor.  He edited the Independent on Sunday, the literary magazine Granta and wrote regularly for The Guardian.

Early life
Jack was born in Farnworth, Lancashire, on 7 February 1945, to parents who had migrated from Fife in 1930. Jack's mother, Isabella (née Gillespie), was born in Kirkcaldy and brought up in Hill of Beath, and his father Henry was born in Dunfermline. The family returned to Scotland when he was seven, in 1952. He grew up in North Queensferry and was educated there and at Dunfermline High School.

Career
After a false start as a would-be librarian, Jack joined The Glasgow Herald as a trainee journalist in 1965.  After a short spell in its head office he was sent to work on two weekly papers in Lanarkshire, the now-defunct Cambuslang Advertiser and the East Kilbride News. Later he worked for the Scottish Daily Express at its Glasgow offices. In 1970, he joined The Sunday Times in London, where he became a section editor and then a foreign correspondent-cum-feature writer with a special interest in South Asia and particularly India, which he began to visit in the mid-1970s. From 1986 to 1989, he wrote for The Observer and Vanity Fair, and then joined the team that created The Independent on Sunday, which he edited from 1991 to 1995. His editorship of the quarterly Granta magazine, to which he had previously contributed as a writer, spanned 47 issues over twelve years to 2007. While at Granta, Jack also commissioned and edited books by Diana Athill, Simon Gray, Janet Malcolm and Travis Elborough, among others. He contributed regularly to The Guardian from 2001, and began to write a weekly column for the paper six years later. He occasionally taught at the India Institute, King's College London.

In 2009, Jack published a collection of essays and previously unpublished writings entitled The Country Formerly Known as Great Britain. One reviewer wrote of Jack's handling of time in this book: "He is up there with a fiction writer such as Alice Munro in his grasp of its ebb and flow, his awareness that its strong but rapidly changing currents often leave us wondering not only what we can remember, but what we should." Alexander Chancellor called the book "superb", and added: "Collections of columns and newspaper articles are not usually a very good idea. They quickly become stale and dated, and one sometimes wonders what the point of them is except to deceive journalists into thinking that their ephemeral scribblings deserve some permanence. Jack is an exception to the rule." The Economist wrote: "At the heart of the book are three magnificent essays, about the Hatfield train crash of 2000; the sinking of the Titanic and the film Titanic (1997); and the lost cinemas of Farnworth, Mr Jack's home town, which is also a circuitous epitaph for a lost brother. His contributions to 'this unequal struggle to preserve and remember' cumulatively transcend journalism and attain the status of literature."

Jack's awards included Journalist of the Year (Granada TV's What the Papers Say award, 1985), Reporter of the Year (British Press Awards, 1988) and Editor of the Year (Newspaper Industry Awards, 1993). He was a Fellow of the Royal Society of Literature.

In 2011, the National Portrait Gallery, London purchased a portrait of Jack by photographer Denis Waugh for its permanent collection.

Personal life and death
Jack married Aparna Bagchi in 1979; the couple divorced in 1992.  He lived in Highbury, London, with his second wife, Lindy Sharpe.  They had two children, and spent a part of every year on the Isle of Bute in the Firth of Clyde.

Jack's paternal grandmother was born in India and lived with his grandfather in the now-demolished mining village of Lassodie, between Dunfermline and Kelty.

Jack died in Paisley, Renfrewshire, on 28 October 2022, after a short illness, aged 77.

Bibliography as author

 (originally from Granta 73)

Bibliography as editor/contributor
 Introduction by Ian Jack.
 Introduction by Ian Jack.

 Introduction by Ian Jack.

References

External links
 

1945 births
2022 deaths
20th-century British journalists
20th-century British male writers
21st-century British journalists
21st-century British male writers
British essayists
British foreign correspondents
British male journalists
British people of Scottish descent
Fellows of the Royal Society of Literature
Granta people
People associated with Fife
People educated at Dunfermline High School
The Guardian people
The Herald (Glasgow) people
The Independent on Sunday editors
The Observer people
The Sunday Times people